Mauricio "Morris" Gamsao Domogan (born October 10, 1946) is a Filipino lawyer and politician and is the longest serving mayor of the city of Baguio. A member of the Lakas Kampi CMD party, Domogan served three terms as mayor of Baguio, initially as acting mayor from July to October 1992, and officially as the new mayor in October 1992 after succeeding the mayoralty post from Ramon Labo after he was disqualified due to his citizenship status, until 2001, and again from 2010 to 2019.

He has also been elected to three terms as a Member of the House of Representatives of the Philippines, representing the Lone District of Baguio. He first won election to Congress in 2001, and was re-elected in 2004 and 2007. In 2019, barred by the constitution to a fourth term, he ran once more for the city's lone congressional seat, against the incumbent Congressman, Marquez Go, to whom Domogan suffered the first loss in his political career.

Early life and career
Domogan was born on October 10, 1946, and traces his roots to the remote sitio of Bab-asig, Patiacan, Quirino (formerly Angaki), Ilocos Sur and within the boundaries of Besao, Mountain Province and Tubo, Abra.

He finished his elementary education at the Patiacan Elementary School in 1961 and finished his secondary education at the Lepanto High School. He obtained his BA degree from the University of Baguio in 1969 and finished his Bachelor of Laws at the University of the Cordilleras in 1973.

Before his political career, he was a private practitioner from 1974 to 1992, focusing on labor issues and was counsel to several unions including Hyatt Terraces Employees Union and Baguio Country Club Employees Union to name a few.

Political career

Councilor, Vice Mayor and Acting Mayor 
Domogan began his political career as a councilor of Baguio from 1988 to 1992. He was later elected as Vice Mayor of Baguio in May 1992 but assumed the position of acting mayor of the city 15 minutes after taking his oath as vice mayor. He served as acting mayor from July 1, 1992 to October 24, 1992, and he assumed the office of the city mayor by virtue of the disqualification of then-elected mayor Jun Labo, who was disqualified by the Supreme Court due to his Australian citizenship.

Mayor (1992–2001)
Domogan’s first term was marked by the task of rehabilitating the city after the July 16, 1990 earthquake in cooperation with then Congressman Bernardo Vergara, the other city officials, city residents, and national leadership. Massive reconstructions of the city roads, buildings and other infrastructures continued during his second and third terms.

These included the modernization of Marcos Highway, the Baguio-Tuba-Itogon-Sablan-La Trinidad (BLIST) circumferential road, and Naguilian Road, the repair, rerouting, declogging and construction of the drainage system of the City Camp Lagoon, among others. In addition, Mayor Domogan orchestrated the twin drive of cleaning and greening the city, which led to the city earning the title of "Cleanest and Greenest Highly Urbanized City" in the country for three consecutive years, elevating the city to the Hall of Fame Award category with a total monetary award of 5 million pesos, which was used to purchase garbage trucks. Moreover, Mayor Domogan was able to lead the city in garnering the highest award that the national government could bestow to a local government unit, namely, the Gawad Pamana ng Lahi Award for two consecutive years, thereby elevating the city, once again, to the Hall of Fame Award category

Congressman (2001-2010)

Being barred by the constitution to run for his fourth consecutive term as mayor, he instead ran as congressman for the Lone District of Baguio in 1998.

During the 12th Congress, Congressman Domogan was able to file twenty (20) bills as main author and fifty (50) bills as co-author. Eleven of these bills have become laws of the land (Republic Acts). part of his Priority Development Assistance Fund (PDAF), was devoted to programmed projects benefiting his constituents in the Barangays, public schools, poor but deserving students, indigent patients, livelihood projects, and computerization program on a continuing basis for elementary and high school of Baguio.

Knowing the problems of the City during the rainy months, he prioritized the dredging, revitalization and construction of the drainage system in the central business district, thus effectively solving the age-old problem of flooding at the foot of Session Road as well as the rehabilitation and repair of the biggest drainage system of the City from the Athletic Swimming Pool to the Rabbit Sink Hole. Cognizant of the City as a tourists destination, he campaigned to entice more visitors to come to Baguio. He Supported the Baguio City Police Office in its security concerns to provide a safe haven to tourists in the City. He provided the impetus to successful tourists-oriented activities such as the Panagbenga Flower Festival, Salad Bowl Festival, and the Summer Vacation Activities.

Mayor (2010–2019)
Being barred by the constitution to run for a fourth consecutive term in the Congress, he decided to reclaim his post as Mayor of Baguio for the 2010 election. He successfully reclaimed such post. He was again re-elected in 2013 and 2016.

2019 Congressional bid 
Being barred by to run for a fourth consecutive term for the city's mayoralty post, he decided to try and reclaim his post as Congressman of the lone district of the CIty. He lost his bid to incumbent congressman Mark Go. This is the first time he lost in his lengthy political career, spanning over 2 decades. He said that he would return to private life and would never abandon the city.

Awards and Recognition

References

External links

 http://mauriciodomogan.com/

20th-century Filipino lawyers
People from Baguio
People from Ilocos Sur
1946 births
Living people
Lakas–CMD (1991) politicians
Lakas–CMD politicians
United Nationalist Alliance politicians
Members of the House of Representatives of the Philippines from Baguio
Mayors of Baguio
University of Baguio alumni
University of the Cordilleras alumni